Syrians in the United Kingdom are people whose heritage is originated from Syria who were born in or who reside in the United Kingdom.

Demography
The 2011 UK Census recorded 8,526 people who stated that they were born in Syria and reside in England; 322 in Wales, 379 in Scotland and 31 in Northern Ireland. The Office for National Statistics estimated that the population stood at 48,000 in 2019. This increase is due largely to the Syrian refugee crisis.

Notable people
This list is by career and then in alphabetical order by the first initial, of the last name.

Actors and entertainment 

 Patrick Baladi (born 1971), actor and musician, known for his role in the British show ‘The Office’
Souad Faress (born 1948), actress, best known for her roles in Game of Thrones (season 6) and BBC’s Radio 4 program The Archers.

Artists and designers 

 Moussa Ayoub (c.1873–1955), Syrian-born British painter and portraiture artist.
 Khairat Al-Saleh (born 1940), painter, ceramicist, glassmaker and printmaker
 Nabil Nayal: fashion designer who won the Fashion Trust Grant from the British Fashion Council and the Royal Society of Arts Award

Academia 

Kamal Abu-Deeb (born 1942), Chair of Arabic at the University of London
Dennis W. Sciama (1926–1999), British physicist of Syrian-descent who, through his own work and that of his students, played a major role in developing British physics after the Second World War.

Writers and journalists 

 Danny Abdul Dayem, citizen-journalist who reported from Homs, Syria between 2011–2012.
 Mai Badr (born 1968), editor-in-chief of Hia Magazine and deputy editor-in-chief of Sayidaty and Al Jamila.
 Abdallah Marrash (1839–1900), Syrian writer involved in various Arabic-language newspaper ventures in London and Paris.
 Mustapha Karkouti: journalist and media consultant
 Nadim Nassar, writer, director of the Awareness Foundation and the only British-Syrian priest in the Church of England
 Rana Kabbani, writer, broadcaster and cultural historian

Other 

Asma al-Assad (born 1975), the First Lady of Syria.
Kefah Mokbel: breast surgeon and founder of the UK charity Breast Cancer Hope. In November 2010, he was named in the Times magazine's list of Britain's Top Doctors
Sami Khiyami, Syrian diplomat, former Syrian ambassador to London.
Shaha Riza (born c.1953), a Libyan former World Bank employee.
Mustafa Suleyman: entrepreneur and co-founder of DeepMind, which Google bought for an estimated £400 million in 2014

See also 

Islam in the United Kingdom
Kurds in the United Kingdom
Turks in the United Kingdom
British Arabs
Syrian Vulnerable Persons Resettlement Programme

References

External links

Associations 

Syrian British Medical Society (SBMS)
Syrian Association for Mental Health (SAMH)
Syria Legal Development Program (SLDP), London
Syria Relief, Manchester
Hand In Hand for Aid and Development
Syrian Platform for Peace (supported by International Alert)
The Oxford Kurdish and Syrian Association, Oxford
Rethink Rebuild, Syrian Community in Manchester
The Council for Arab-British Understanding (Caabu)

United Kingdom
Muslim communities in Europe
 
Syria–United Kingdom relations